Denmark and Norway have a very long history together: they were both part of the Kalmar Union between 1397 and 1523, and Norway was in a Union with Denmark between 1524 and 1814.

The two countries established diplomatic relations in 1905, after Norway ended its union with Sweden. Denmark has an embassy in Oslo and Norway has an embassy in Copenhagen.

Both countries are full members of the Nordic Council, Council of the Baltic Sea States, NATO, OECD, OSCE, Arctic Council, Council of Europe and the World Trade Organization. There are around 15,000 Norwegians living in Denmark and around 20,000 Danes living in Norway.

Early history
Relations date back to the Middle Ages, when both countries were first established in the 8th-9th century. Denmark took part in the Battle of Svolder against Norway in 999 or 1000, and in the following partition of Norway.

Kalmar Union

The Kalmar Union is a historiographical term meaning a series of personal unions that united the three kingdoms of Denmark, Norway (with Iceland, Greenland, Faroe Islands, Shetland, and Orkney), and Sweden (including Finland) under a single monarch, though intermittently and with a population less than 3,000,000.

The countries had not technically given up their sovereignty, nor their independence, but in practical terms, they were not autonomous, the common monarch holding the sovereignty and, particularly, leading foreign policy; diverging interests (especially the Swedish nobility's dissatisfaction over the dominant role played by Denmark and Holstein) gave rise to a conflict that would hamper the union in several intervals from the 1430s until the union's breakup in 1523 when Gustav Vasa became king of Sweden.

Norway and its overseas dependencies, however, continued to remain a part of the realm of Denmark–Norway under the Oldenburg dynasty for several centuries until its dissolution in 1814.

Denmark–Norway

Denmark–Norway is the historiographical name for a former political entity consisting of the kingdoms of Denmark and Norway, including the originally Norwegian dependencies of Iceland, Greenland and the Faroe Islands. Following the strife surrounding the break-up of its predecessor, the Kalmar Union, the two kingdoms entered into another personal union in 1524 which lasted until 1814. The corresponding adjective and demonym is Dano-Norwegian.

The term Kingdom of Denmark is sometimes used to include both countries in the period 1536–1660, since the political and economic power emanated from Copenhagen, Denmark. The term covers the "royal part" of the Oldenburgs as it was in 1460, excluding the "ducal part" of Schleswig and Holstein. The administration used two official languages, Danish and German, and for several centuries both a Danish and German Chancery existed.

Separation
Denmark and Norway parted when the union was dissolved in 1814. Iceland, which legally became a Danish colony in 1814, became an independent country in 1918 in a personal union, which would end in 1944.

Denmark is one of the original signatories of the Svalbard Treaty from 1920, which recognizes the sovereignty of Norway over the archipelago of Svalbard in the Arctic Ocean, and grants signatories equal rights to engage in commercial activities and scientific research on the archipelago. In the early 1930s Norway occupied portions of the Danish territory of Greenland. In 1933, the Permanent Court of International Justice ruled against Norwegian claims, and the occupation ended.

World War II

Both Denmark and Norway were invaded by Germany in 1940, and the mainland territories of both countries were afterwards under German occupation with relatively light casualties.

Modern relations
Denmark and Norway co-hosted the 1999 World Women's Handball Championship and 2010 European Women's Handball Championship, and are the scheduled hosts of the 2023 World Women's Handball Championship (alongside Sweden), the 2025 World Men's Handball Championship (alongside Croatia), the 2026 European Men's Handball Championship (alongside Sweden) and the 2028 European Women's Handball Championship (alongside Sweden).

Denmark and Norway are important trading partners. In 2019, the two countries were each other's fifth largest sources of imports, whereas Norway was the third largest export destination for Denmark, and Denmark was the sixth largest export destination for Norway.

The Baltic Pipe, connecting Norway with Denmark and Poland, is scheduled to be completed in October 2022. Its purpose is to ensure natural gas supplies from Norway to Denmark and Poland.

See also
 Foreign relations of Denmark
 Foreign relations of Norway
 Danish humanitarian aid to Norway during World War II
 Danish and Norwegian alphabet
 Denmark-Norway
 Differences between Norwegian Bokmål and Standard Danish
 Royal Dano-Norwegian Navy
 Treaty of Copenhagen (1660)
 Danish colonization of the Americas
 Danish Norwegians

References

External links
  Danish embassy in Oslo (in Danish only)
  Norwegian embassy in Copenhagen  (in Norwegian only)

 
Norway
Bilateral relations of Norway